The Whore is a 2010 German television film, adapted from a novel by the same name. The film is set in Konstanz, Germany in the years 1414 and 1415. The novel was written by Iny Lorentz. The screenplay was adapted by Gabriele Kister and directed by Hansjörg Thurn. The sequel is the 2012 television film The Revenge of the Whore.

Cast
 Alexandra Neldel as Marie Schärer
 Attila Árpa as Utz Kaffli
 Alexander Beyer as Jodokus von Arnstein / Ewald von Marburg
 Thure Riefenstein as Graf Dietmar von Arnstein
 Thomas Morris as Pfalzgraf Ludwig III
 Gregor Seberg as Hunold
 Elena Uhlig as Gräfin von Arnstein
 Michael Brandner as Graf von Keilburg
 Bert Tischendorf as Michel
 Julian Weigend as Ruppertus
 Blerim Destani as Giso
 Lili Gesler as Madeleine
 Nadja Becker as Hiltrud
 Götz Otto as König
 Daniel Roesner as Kleiner Soldat

See also
 List of historical drama films

References

External links
 

2010 television films
2010 films
German television films
2010s German-language films
Films set in the Holy Roman Empire
Films set in the 1410s
Films based on German novels
Television shows based on German novels
German-language television shows
Sat.1 original programming